Sajjad Moradi (born 30 March 1983) is an Iranian middle distance runner who specializes in the 800 m and 1500 m. He holds multiple national records for Iran from various track disciplines. Moradi is a gold-medalist in the Asian Games, Asian Athletics Championships, Asian Indoor Games, and Universiade. He also competed at three Summer Olympic Games in 2004, 2008, and 2012.

Biography
He was born in Lordegan. Sajjad is the older brother of Amir Moradi (born 1990), who is also an elite track athlete specializing in the 800 and 1500 metres.

Running career

2004 Summer Olympics
Barely 21 years old, Moradi ran sixth heat at the men's 800 metres at the 2004 Summer Olympics with a time of 1:49.10, exiting in the first round. In his heat, Moradi lost out to older and more experienced Ivan Heshko and Amine Laâlou.

2008 Summer Olympics
Moradi ran both the men's 800 metres at the 2008 Summer Olympics in Beijing and the men's 1500 metres of the same competition. For the 800, he narrowly missed qualification for the final 800, running a 1:46.08 just one place behind the last finals qualifier.

2012 Summer Olympics
Moradi ran the men's 800 metres at the 2012 Summer Olympics in London. He ran fifth heat of the race and ran a time of 1:48.23, qualifying for the next round. In the semifinal, however, he got disqualified for a lane violation.

Achievements

References

External links 

All-Athletics profile for Sadjad Moradi

Living people
1983 births
Iranian male middle-distance runners
Olympic athletes of Iran
Athletes (track and field) at the 2004 Summer Olympics
Athletes (track and field) at the 2008 Summer Olympics
Athletes (track and field) at the 2012 Summer Olympics
Asian Games gold medalists for Iran
Asian Games silver medalists for Iran
Asian Games medalists in athletics (track and field)
Athletes (track and field) at the 2002 Asian Games
Athletes (track and field) at the 2006 Asian Games
Athletes (track and field) at the 2010 Asian Games
Athletes (track and field) at the 2014 Asian Games
Medalists at the 2010 Asian Games
Universiade medalists in athletics (track and field)
Universiade gold medalists for Iran
Medalists at the 2009 Summer Universiade
20th-century Iranian people
21st-century Iranian people